XEBBB-AM is a radio station on 1040 AM in Guadalajara, Jalisco, Mexico. It is owned by Promomedios and carries the Catholic programming of ESNE Radio.

History
XEBBB received its concession on February 24, 1972 as XECX-AM. The 5 kW daytimer broadcast from Zapopan and was owned by Jorge González Velasco. The callsign changed to XEBBB-AM in late 1979. XEBBB was later sold to Radio Cosmos, S.A. and then to its current concessionaire.

At the start of September 2018, XEAAA-AM 880 and XEBBB exchanged formats, with the Catholic ESNE Radio format moving to 1040 and RadioMujer women's talk moving to 880 AM. This was done in order to migrate Radio Mujer to FM.

References

Radio stations in Guadalajara